is a Japanese judoka.
Ebinuma is a triple world champion, having won in 2011, 2013 and 2014. A dominant force in the half-lightweight division, he was ranked first in the world for three years. He is regarded as an ultimate stylist of seoi nage. He is also known for being a quadruple All-Japan national champion.

Ebinuma won bronze medals at the 2012 Olympics and the 2016 Olympics. He married judoka Kana Abe in 2014.

Career 
In one of the most controversial fights in judo with Ebinuma beating South Korea's Cho Jun-ho, Cho Jun-ho was initially announced as the victor. His score was overturned by the judges after a replay.

In the bronze medal match in the London 2012 Olympics, an ippon was scored against him by Poland's Paweł Zagrodnik. It was downgraded to a waza-ari, saving him from defeat and earning him his first Olympic medal.

At the 2016 Olympics, he beat Charles Chibana, Ma Duanbin and Wander Mateo before losing to An Ba-ul.  Because An reached the final, Ebinuma was entered into the repechage, where he beat Antoine Bouchard to win his second bronze medal.

Achievements

2006
 Asian U20 Championships -66 kg, Jeju
2008
 Grand Slam -66 kg, Tokyo
 World U20 Championships -66 kg, Bangkok
2009
 Summer Universiade -66 kg, Belgrade
 Grand Prix -66 kg, Abu Dhabi
 Grand Slam -66 kg, Tokyo
 World Cup -66 kg, Budapest
2010
 World Cup Team -66 kg, Salvador
 All Japan Judo Championships -66 kg, Fukuoka
 Grand Slam -66 kg, Tokyo
2011
 World Championships -66 kg, Paris
 All Japan Judo Championships -66 kg, Fukuoka
 World Cup -66 kg, Budapest
 Grand Slam -66 kg, Rio de Janeiro
 Grand Slam -66 kg, Tokyo
2012
 All Japan Judo Championships -66 kg, Fukuoka
 Olympic Games -66 kg, London
 World Masters -66 kg, Almaty
2013
 World Championships -66 kg, Rio de Janeiro
 Grand Prix -66 kg, Düsseldorf
 All Japan Judo Championships -66 kg, Fukuoka
2014
 Grand Prix -66 kg, Düsseldorf
 World Championships -66 kg, Chelyabinsk

References

External links
 
 
 
 

1990 births
Living people
Japanese male judoka
Judoka at the 2012 Summer Olympics
Judoka at the 2016 Summer Olympics
Olympic judoka of Japan
World judo champions
Olympic medalists in judo
Olympic bronze medalists for Japan
Medalists at the 2012 Summer Olympics
Medalists at the 2016 Summer Olympics
Universiade medalists in judo
Judoka at the 2018 Asian Games
Asian Games gold medalists for Japan
Asian Games medalists in judo
Medalists at the 2018 Asian Games
Universiade gold medalists for Japan
Medalists at the 2009 Summer Universiade
Sportspeople from Tochigi Prefecture
21st-century Japanese people